Wiehlenarius is a genus of sheet weavers that was first described by K. Y. Eskov in 1990.

Species
 it contains only two species:
Wiehlenarius boreus Eskov, 1990 – Russia
Wiehlenarius tirolensis (Schenkel, 1939) – Switzerland, Austria, Greece

See also
 List of Linyphiidae species (Q–Z)

References

Araneomorphae genera
Linyphiidae
Spiders of Russia